Palwasha: (پلوشه) is a feminine given name originating in Pashto, meaning ray of light.

Notable people named Palwasha include:

Palwasha Bashir, Pakistani badminton player
Palwasha Khan, Pakistani politician
Palwasha Mohammad Zai Khan, Pakistani politician
Palwasha Hassan, Afghan activist

References